WQNX (1350 AM) was a radio station broadcasting a news/talk format. Licensed to Aberdeen, North Carolina, United States.  The station was owned by Golf Capital Broadcasting.

WQNX was deleted by the Federal Communications Commission (FCC) on December 2, 2011 for failure to file for the renewal of its license (which expired a day earlier).

References

External links
 Query the FCC's AM station database for WQNX

QNX
Defunct radio stations in the United States
Radio stations disestablished in 2011
Radio stations established in 1983
1983 establishments in North Carolina
2011 disestablishments in North Carolina
QNX